Jesús Agustín López de Lama (25 December 1929 – 8 February 2023) was a Spanish Roman Catholic prelate.

López de Lama was born in Spain and was ordained to the priesthood in 1954. He was appointed prefect of the Roman Catholic Territorial Prelature of Corocoro, Bolivia in 1966 and was ordained titular bishop of Casae Calanae. He resigned in 1991.

López de Lama died in Bilbao on 8 February 2023, at the age of 93.

References

1929 births
2023 deaths
Bishops appointed by Pope Paul VI
Spanish Roman Catholic bishops
People from Pacajes Province